Vypolzovo is a rural locality (a selo) in Starooskolsky District, Belgorod Oblast, Russia. The population was 147 as of 2010. There are 12 streets.

Geography 
Vypolzovo is located 23 km southeast of Stary Oskol (the district's administrative centre) by road. Chernikovo is the nearest rural locality.

References 

Rural localities in Starooskolsky District